Gayville is a hamlet in Putnam County, in the U.S. state of New York.

Gayville was named for a family of early settlers.

References

Hamlets in Putnam County, New York